Jaylen Maurice Barford (born January 23, 1996) is an American professional basketball player for Russian team Lokomotiv Kuban of the VTB United League. He played college basketball for the Arkansas Razorbacks.

High school career
Barford attended South Side High School in Jackson, Tennessee. As a senior, he led his team to the Class AA State Championship and averaged 22.5 points, three assists and three steals per game. Barford was named the West Tennessee Player of the Year and District 14-AA Player of the Year.

College career
Barford began his collegiate career at Motlow State Community College, where he averaged 20.6 points, 7.1 rebounds, 5.1 assists and 2.4 steals per game as a freshman. He was named to the All-TCCAA First Team. As a sophomore, he led all junior college players in scoring with 26.2 points per game. Barford was named to the NJCAA Division I Men's Basketball First Team All-America. He was the No. 1 junior college transfer in the 2016 class when he committed to Arkansas.

As a junior at Arkansas, Barford averaged 12.8 points, 3.8 rebounds and 2 assists per game. He considered leaving early to pursue a pro career and declared for the 2017 NBA draft, but ultimately decided to return to Arkansas. On December 30, 2017, Barford notched a career-high 28 points in an overtime win against Tennessee Volunteers in which backcourt mate Daryl Macon also had a career high in points. Barford matched his career high with 28 points in an 88–73 loss to Florida on January 17, 2018. As a senior, he averaged 17.9 points and 3.9 rebounds per game. At the conclusion of the regular season he was named to the First Team All-SEC. After the season, he was invited to the Portsmouth Invitational Tournament and won MVP after averaging 19.3 points per game.

Professional career

Greensboro Swarm (2018–2019)
After going undrafted in the 2018 NBA draft, Barford joined the Minnesota Timberwolves for the 2018 NBA Summer League play. On July 26, he signed a training camp deal with the Charlotte Hornets. Barford was waived by the Hornets on October 11. He subsequently was added to the roster of the Hornets’ NBA G League affiliate, the Greensboro Swarm.

Italian Serie A (2019–2020)
On July 12, 2019, Barford signed with VL Pesaro of the LBA. Given the difficulties of Pesaro, next to the relegation, he left the team before the end of the season and moved to Virtus Roma. In his only game for the team, Barford had 13 points, 7 rebounds and 3 assists.

Egypt (2020–2021)
On October 27, 2020, Barford signed with Al Ittihad Alexandria of the Egyptian Basketball Super League.

Italian Serie A (2021)
Barford returned to Italy on February 8, 2021, signing until the end of the season for Vanoli Cremona. He averaged 15 points and 3.3 rebounds per game.

Kazakhstan (2021–2022)
On September 20, 2021, Barford signed with Astana of the Kazakhstan Championship, the VTB United League, and the FIBA Asia Champions Cup. He averaged 23 points, 4.8 rebounds, 2.1 steals and 1.6 assists per game in VTB United League play.

Russia (2022–present)
On February 1, 2022, Barford signed with the Russian team Lokomotiv Kuban of the VTB United League.

Career statistics

College

|-
| style="text-align:left;"| 2016–17
| style="text-align:left;"| Arkansas
| 36 || 30 || 25.4 || .438 || .266 || .752 || 3.8 || 2.0 || 1.2 || .2 || 12.8
|-
| style="text-align:left;"| 2017–18
| style="text-align:left;"| Arkansas
| 35 || 35 || 31.3 || .470 || .431 || .721 || 3.9 || 2.5 || 1.0 || .3 || 17.9
|- class="sortbottom"
| style="text-align:center;" colspan="2"| Career
| 71 || 65 || 28.3 || .455 || .373 || .735 || 3.8 || 2.3 || 1.1 || .2 || 15.3

College statistics only available for final two years at Arkansas.

References

External links 
Arkansas Razorbacks bio

1996 births
Living people
Al Ittihad Alexandria Club basketball players
American men's basketball players
American expatriate basketball people in Italy
Arkansas Razorbacks men's basketball players
Basketball players from Tennessee
BC Astana players
Greensboro Swarm players
Motlow State Bucks men's basketball players
PBC Lokomotiv-Kuban players
People from Jackson, Tennessee
Point guards